Frederick Paul Ott (1860; New Jersey – October 24, 1936; West Orange, New Jersey), skilled machinist, was a key employee of Thomas Edison's laboratories from the 1870s until Edison's death in 1931. His likeness appears in two of the earliest surviving motion pictures – the well-known Edison Kinetoscopic Record of a Sneeze (a.k.a. Fred Ott's Sneeze) and the little-seen Fred Ott Holding a Bird – both from 1894.

The former became an icon of cinema itself. Shot in medium close-up, the film shows Ott seemingly taking a pinch of snuff causing him to sneeze. Comic in format, The Sneeze, as it also came to be known, was made in early January 1894 at the request of Harper's Weekly magazine, which requested illustrations for an article about the Kinetoscope.

Ott began working with Edison in 1874 (at age 14) and became one of the inventor's most valued employees and closest friends. Alongside his brother John F. Ott, he worked with Edison on many inventions, retiring shortly after the nearly-simultaneous deaths of Edison and John Ott in 1931. Ott died at his home in West Orange, New Jersey, on October 24, 1936.

Filmography
Edison Kinetoscopic Record of a Sneeze (1894) 
Fred Ott Holding a Bird (1894)
[Thomas Alva Edison--outtakes] (Fox Movietone News Story 5-537, recorded in Fort Meyers, Florida, March 15, 1930) University of South Carolina Moving Image Research Collections, https://digital.tcl.sc.edu/digital/collection/MVTN/id/2409.

See also
 Fred Ott's Sneeze
 William Kennedy Laurie Dickson, 1860–1935, production
 History of film
 Kinetoscope
 1894 in film

References

External links

 Edison Kinetoscopic Record of a Sneeze, January 7, 1894, Library of Congress

Fred Ott's Sneeze through the Ages (Gary M. Atkins, 1979) 18 min. a.k.a. Variations on a Theme: Fred Ott's Sneeze through the Ages Super 8 film produced in Columbia, South Carolina
 Ott - A Modern Day Remake of Fred Ott's Sneeze, in Idea: A Remake of “Fred Ott’s Sneeze," (May 1, 2006) at Ironic Sans. Flash video no longer online; static archive page of Ironic Sans blog. 

1860 births
1936 deaths
People from West Orange, New Jersey
Articles containing video clips